Mount Crowell is a mountain in the northern part of the Rare Range in Palmer Land. It was mapped by the United States Geological Survey from ground surveys and from U.S. Navy air photos, 1961–67, and named by the Advisory Committee on Antarctic Names for John C. Crowell, a geologist at McMurdo Station in the summer of 1966–67.

References
 

Mountains of Palmer Land